Pyhä-Luosto National Park (Pyhä-Luoston kansallispuisto) is a national park in Lapland, Finland. It was established in 2005 when Finland's oldest national park, Pyhätunturi National Park (established in 1938), was joined to Luosto. This makes Pyhä-Luosto both one of Finland's oldest and newest national parks. Its most important features are its geological specialities, old forests and wetlands.

The park's base is formed by Finland's southernmost, 12-peak tunturi line. The tunturit are remnants of 2-billion-year-old Alp-like mountains. Pine tree forests that are 200 years old or older grow on the hills. The highest tunturit are Noitatunturi, and Ukko-Luosto, .

In 2015, the visitor count was 115,100 people, which was a decrease from the 2009 count of 128,000.

See also 
 List of national parks of Finland
 Protected areas of Finland

References

External links
 
 Outdoors.fi – Pyhä-Luosto National Park

National parks of Finland
Protected areas of the Arctic
Protected areas established in 2005
Geography of Lapland (Finland)
Tourist attractions in Lapland (Finland)